Upper Mediezie Ward also known as Upper Agri Ward is a ward located under Nagaland's capital city, Kohima. The ward falls under the designated Ward No. 17 of the Kohima Municipal Council.

Education
Educational Institutions in Upper Agri Ward:

Schools 
 Fernwood School
 Stella Higher Secondary School

See also
 Municipal Wards of Kohima

References

External links
 Map of Kohima Ward No.17

Kohima
Wards of Kohima